The Shereyk Power Station is a proposed hydroelectric power plant of the River Nile in  Sudan. It has a power generating capacity of  enough to power over 235,000 homes

References

Hydroelectric power stations in Sudan
Proposed hydroelectric power stations
Shereyk
Dams on the Nile
Proposed renewable energy power stations in Sudan